was a town located in Yamamoto District, Akita Prefecture, Japan.

As of 2003, the town has an estimated population of 5,819 and a density of 52.24 persons per km². The total area is 111.38 km².

On March 20, 2006, Kotooka, along with the towns of Hachiryū and Yamamoto (all from Yamamoto District), was merged to create the town of Mitane.

External links
 Mitane official website 

Dissolved municipalities of Akita Prefecture
Mitane, Akita